The Second Battle of Lyman was a military engagement during the 2022 Russian invasion of Ukraine, as part of the 2022 Ukrainian eastern counteroffensive. The battle started on 10 September 2022 during the counteroffensive and ended three weeks later on 2 October. By 30 September, Ukrainian forces had closed in on the city after crossing the Siverskyi Donets River, advancing along Lyman's southern and eastern flanks while capturing land northwest of the settlement, allowing Ukrainian forces to cut off the only road left supplying the occupying forces from the north. On 1 October, Ukrainian forces entered Lyman after a Russian withdrawal.

Background 

A month into the Russian invasion of Ukraine on 24 February 2022, Russia claimed to control 93% of Luhansk Oblast, leaving Sievierodonetsk and Lysychansk as strategically important Ukrainian holdouts in the area. Russian plans to capture Sievierodonetsk hinged upon its successes in the nearby cities of Rubizhne to the north and Popasna to the south. By 6 April, Russian forces had reportedly captured 60% of Rubizhne, and shells and rockets were landing in Sievierodonetsk at "regular, sustained intervals". The next day, Ukrainian forces of the 128th Mountain Assault Brigade conducted an offensive which reportedly drove Russian forces 6–10 kilometers away from the other nearby town of Kreminna. Russian forces reportedly seized Rubizhne and the nearby town of Voevodivka on 12 May 2022.

South of Lyman, the battle of the Siverskyi Donets occurred mid-May 2022, with Ukraine repelling multiple Russian attempts to cross the river. Russian forces suffered an estimated 400 to 485 dead and wounded during the attempts.

On 27 May, however, Ukrainian Defence Ministry claimed that the battle for control of the city was still ongoing, stating their forces were continuing to hold the southwestern and northeastern districts, while other Ukrainian officials acknowledged most of Lyman, including the city center, was under Russian control. In addition, the United Kingdom also assessed most of the town had come under Russian control by 27 May.

Battle

On 3 September, Ukrainian forces crossed the Siverskyi Donets River and recaptured Ozerne, the first village on that side of the river to fall into Ukrainian hands since June. On September 5, they entered the village of Staryi Karavan, just 15 kilometers from Lyman.

Amid the 2022 Ukrainian Kharkiv counteroffensive, when Ukraine retook Kupiansk and Izyum, Ukraine also claimed it had reached the southern outskirts of Lyman on 10 September. The same day, military equipment was sent to Lyman and battles were fought on the outskirts of the city. Igor Girkin reported that the Russian army had retreated and units from the LPR and DPR forces were defending forested areas near Lyman. Ukrainian forces were moving to encircle Lyman from the south, east, west and northwest, and later north, while Russian forces identified the Russian defenders of Lyman to BARS-13 and BARS-16 detachments (the latter of which is known as the “Kuban” detachment), which are sub-battalion formations comprising Russian reservists from the Russian Special Combat Army Reserve. By 30 September, Russian war correspondent, Semyon Pegov (aka WarGonzo), reported that the last highway into Lyman had been cut off by Ukrainian forces, calling the situation "extremely difficult" for the Russian soldiers there, and pointed out then "elements of the BARS-13 detachment and the 752nd Motorized Rifle Regiment of the 20th Combined Arms Army, which are reportedly defending around Drobysheve and into Lyman." On 1 October Ukrainian troops raised the Ukrainian flag at an entrance sign to Lyman, after the Russian troops claimed to have withdrawn.

Lyman Pocket

South
After recapturing Ozerne and Staryi Karavan, Ukrainian forces went on to retake Dibrova and Brusivka to consolidate gains. On 17 September, Ukraine liberated the town of Shchurove, 6 km southwest of Lyman.

East
Ukrainian forces also pressed upon Yampil, a village to the southeast of Lyman. Ukrainian forces also liberated Bilohorivka in Luhansk Oblast, not only to deny Russian full control of Luhansk, but also to open another route to assist in the battle for Lyman.

On 28 September, several Russian sources reported that Ukrainian troops pushed southeast of Kolodiazi (which is north of Lyman) and are fighting on the outskirts of Torske, 12 km northeast of Lyman. Some Russian milbloggers also claimed that Ukrainian troops accumulated near Yampil (13 km southeast of Lyman) and broke through Russian defensive lines there to push towards Torske from the southwest. Some milbloggers were concerned that Svatove-Lyman road that is currently a critical ground line of communication (GLOC) for the Russian grouping in Lyman can be severed at any time by Ukrainian forces, thus finishing the encirclement of Russian troops in Lyman.

On 30 September, Ukrainian forces liberated Yampil, and engaged in fierce battle around Zarichne-Torske area. Some Russian milbloggers claimed that Ukrainian forces have crossed the Siverskyi Donets River in Dronivka and are operating in the forests south of Kreminna, and Russian sources uniformly noted that Ukrainian artillery continues to interdict Russian forces’ single remaining egress route on the Kreminna-Torske road.

West and northwest
On 12 September, Ukrainian forces crossed the Siverskyi Donets River, and liberated the strategic town of Sviatohirsk, 3 km east of Bohorodychne.

On 15 September, Ukrainian forces retook Sosnove in Donetsk Oblast and to the east of Sviatohirsk, forcing the small Russian force in the nearby Studenok, Izium Raion, a settlement in Kharkiv Oblast and to the east of Oskil River, to withdraw to avoid encirclement. Using Sosnove and Studenok as springboards, Ukraine branched out in two directions, one to the north and advancing to Krymky, Oleksandrivka, Yatskivka, and Korovii Yar, all within Donetsk Oblast, and recaptured them by 22 September, inching closer to the administrative border of Donetsk Oblast and Kharkiv Oblast as well as Luhansk Oblast.

The other direction was east and engaged in fierce battles in nearby Yarova by 19 September; with Russian military bloggers reporting fighting in Drobysheve on 21 September.

By 24 September, Russian military bloggers were reporting that Ukrainian forces had taken control of half of Novoselivka, 10km northwest of Lyman and next to both Yarova and Drobysheve; by 28 September, the Ukrainian 81st Brigade, along with the National Guard, fully liberated Novoselivka and advanced further south and east towards Lyman.

Ukraine's President Zelenskyy spoke of progress around Lyman in a video address on 30 September. He thanked Ukrainian troops for the liberation of Yampil, to the southeast and Drobysheve, to the northwest of the city.

North

On 22 September, several Russian sources reported fighting to the northwest of Lyman and claimed that Ukrainian troops penetrated Russian defenses in Ridkodub and Karpivka, Kramatorsk Raion, both 20 km north of Lyman.

By 24-25 September, Ukrainian forces not only tried to push south from the Ridkodub-Nove line, but also crossed the administrative border between Donetsk and Kharkiv and advanced north and liberated a few settlements, like Maliivka, Pisky-Radkivskiy, and a few others to the south and southeast of Borova.

By 28 September, Ukrainian forces had recaptured Karpivka, Nove, Ridkodub, and Novoselivka in Donetsk Oblast, and were advancing eastward to liberate Katerynivka. It was also reported that Ukrainian forces had liberated , about 15 km north of Lyman and directly south to Nove, another newly liberated settlement, and northeast to Shandryholove. Geolocated combat footage corroborated claims made by Russian milbloggers that Ukrainians took control of Zelena Dolyna and pushed east to take control of Kolodiazi (11 km northeast of Lyman).

Another Russian milblogger, Rybar, pointed out that Ukrainian troops are attacking Lyman from three directions and have cut Russian access to the critical Svatove-Lyman road, which is the major ground line of communication (GLOC) sustaining the Russian grouping within Lyman itself.

On 30 September, Russian sources indicated Ukrainian forces recaptured Stavky and severed the Drobysheve-Torske road, causing Russia to abandon Drobysheve.

Fall of the city and withdrawal of the Russian troops
On 1 October, Ukrainian troops raised the Ukrainian flag at an entrance to the city of Lyman. It was initially reported that up to 5,000 Russian troops remained trapped inside. Russia confirmed that it had lost control of Lyman later that afternoon. According to Serhii Cherevatyi, spokesperson for Ukraine's eastern forces, the Russian forces were surrounded. He said that the capture of Lyman was important because "it is the next step towards liberation of the Ukrainian Donbas".  The gains came a day after Russian president Putin proclaimed at a ceremony in Moscow, that the occupied regions of Ukraine, including the Donbas, were now Russian. Retired US general Ben Hodges said "This puts in bright lights that his claim is illegitimate and cannot be enforced".

Later on 1 October, Russian sources stated that their troops had withdrawn from Lyman toward the east, including Kreminna. Ukrainian sources later concurred that most of the Russian garrison had pulled out, though some troops had been left behind and were mopped up by the advancing Ukrainians. The United Kingdom Ministry of Defence estimated that the Russian forces had taken "heavy" losses during their hasty retreat to escape the encirclement. Following the battle, British intelligence assessed that the Russian forces defending the town were a mixed group of mobilized reservists and depleted professional troops.  Based on social media messages and announcements of combat losses, the BBC assessed the 3rd Guards Spetsnaz Brigade suffered its worst casualties to date during fighting in Lyman, with the possibility that 75% of its reconnaissance company troops were lost. A significant number of fleeing Russian troops were trapped in a smaller pocket east of the city. Some Russian contingents had also lost contact to their main force, and hid in the nearby forests.

Ukrainian President Volodymyr Zelenskyy confirmed on 2 October that Lyman had been "fully cleared".

Aftermath

Ukraine regained an important railroad hub, allowing mop-up operations in northern Donetsk Oblast (on the left side of the Siverskyi Donets river). The recapture of Lyman also dealt a blow to the legitimacy of the Russian annexation of Donetsk and Luhansk Oblasts on 30 September 2022, and opened the doors to possible northward advance to Svatove and eastward advance to Kreminna.

On 7 October 2022, governor Pavlo Kyrylenko and Ukrinform stated that a mass grave containing about 180 bodies had been found in Lyman. The exact number, identities (military or civilian) and causes of death of the people were not yet known. On 20 October, Donetsk Oblast Police Department reported that the bodies of 111 civilians and 35 soldiers were found in a mass burial site consisting of trenches, with some graves unmarked. At the time, the police said '58 mass burial sites [had] been found in the liberated settlements of Donetsk Oblast', 25 of which were located in Lyman.

See also 
 Outline of the Russo-Ukrainian War

References

Battles of the 2022 Russian invasion of Ukraine
Battles of the war in Donbas
Battles involving the Donetsk People's Republic
Eastern Ukraine offensive
Battle
September 2022 events in Ukraine
October 2022 events in Ukraine
Mass graves in Ukraine